Sheikh Shahidur Rahman (1950/1 – 22 August 2021) was a Bangladeshi politician affiliated with the Workers Party of Bangladesh who served the Khulna-4 district as a member of the Jatiya Sangsad from 1986 to 1988.

Biography
Sheikh Shahidur Rahman was born in Khulna District. Sheikh Shahidur Rahman was elected to parliament from Khulna-4 as a Workers Party of Bangladesh candidate in 1986. He was the president of Khulna District Workers Party. Rahman died on 22 August 2021 in Khulna , Bangladesh due to a heart attack at the age of 70.

References

External links 

 List of 3rd Parliament Members -Jatiya Sangsad (In Bangla)

1950s births
2021 deaths
People from Khulna District
Workers Party of Bangladesh politicians
3rd Jatiya Sangsad members
Year of birth uncertain